Ashtarjan Rural District is a rural district (dehestan) in Central District, Falavarjan County, Isfahan province, Iran. At the 2006 census, its population was 13,958, in 3,606 families.

References 

Rural Districts of Isfahan Province
Falavarjan County